This is a list of alumni of S. Thomas' College, Mt. Lavinia Sri Lanka.

It also includes without distinction the alumni from its affiliated schools S. Thomas' College, Bandarawela, S. Thomas' College, Guruthalawa, and S. Thomas' Preparatory School.

Politics

Members of the Independence Movement

Civil servants

Military

Air Force

Army

Navy

Police

Academia

Sports

Business

NGO

Arts

Religion

References

Saint Thomas' College